

Karl-Wilhelm von Schlieben (30 October 1894 – 18 June 1964) was a German general in the Wehrmacht during World War II.

Biography
Schlieben joined the Prussian Army in August 1914 and served during World War I. He served as a regimental commander with the 1st Panzer Division during the Battle of France in 1940. He then served as a Brigade Commander with the 4th Panzer Division on the Eastern Front, from June 1942. In February 1943, Schlieben briefly took command of the 208th Infantry Division, before being transferred to the 18th Panzer Division in April, again as division commander.  

Following the Battle of Kursk the division was disbanded, and in December 1943, he was assigned command of the 709th Static Infantry Division based in Normandy, France.

The unit was used for occupation duties in France. The division was on the Normandy coast when the invasion took place, and thus fought in the early days of the Battle of Normandy, quickly becoming trapped in the Cotentin. As U.S. forces sealed off the Peninsula, the remnants of the Division fell back on Cherbourg.

On 23 June 1944, Schlieben was appointed Commandant of Cherbourg, which the German high Command had designated as a 'fortress'. Three days later von Schlieben and over 800 other troops surrendered to Major General Manton S. Eddy the Commander of the U.S. 9th Infantry Division. He was held at Trent Park before he was transferred to Island Farm on 9 August 1945. He was released on 7 October 1947. Schlieben died on 18 June 1964 in Gießen.

Sources 
 Gordon A.Harrison, Cross Channel Attack
 Jorge Rosado & Chris Bishop, German Wehrmacht Panzer Divisions
 John Keegan, Six Armies in Normandy
 De Wervelwind 3(22) June–July 1944 - Dutch war time propaganda newspaper

1894 births
1964 deaths
People from Eisenach
German Army personnel of World War I
Lieutenant generals of the German Army (Wehrmacht)
German nobility
Von Schlieben family
German prisoners of war in World War II held by the United States
Recipients of the clasp to the Iron Cross, 1st class
Recipients of the Gold German Cross
Recipients of the Knight's Cross of the Iron Cross
People from Saxe-Eisenach
Military personnel from Thuringia